The Machhoya Ahir are a gotra of the Ahir found in the Rajkot, Kutch, Junagadh,Amreli, Bhavnagar, Morbi, Jamnagar state of Gujarat in India.

Origin 
When the Ahirs came from Mathura to Dwarka with Lord Krishna, they spread all over Saurashtra and Kutch Gujarat region.The Maschoiya are a community of Ahirs who are said to have settled along the banks of the Machhu-katia river, and the word Maschhoiya literally means those from Macchu-katia. According to the traditions of the Maschoiya were originally Soomra Ahirs, and an ancestor left Sindh for Saurashtra, where she married an Ahir king. Their descendants thus became Maschoiya Ahir. The Maschoiya Ahir are found mainly in Rajkot District, Kutch District, Morbi District, Junagadh District, Amreli and Bhavnagar found in. They are a Gujarati speaking community.

Present circumstances 
The Maschoiya are divided into a number of exogamous clans called Ataks like

Humbal,
Ahir,
Lokhil,
Khimaniya,
Mand(Marand), 
Miyatra (Myatra), 
Makawana,
Dangar, 
Sonara,
Jalu(Jaru),
Chaiya(Chhaiya),
Bakotra(Bakutra),
Virda,
Kangad,
Zer,
Lavadiya, 
Meta, 
Herbha, 
Hethvadiya, 
Chavda,
Jatiya,
Lula,
Balasara,
Gujariya,
Kothivar 
Goyal(Gohel)
Chudasama,
Avadiya,
Segaliya,
Khatariya,
Jiladiya,
Kuvadiya,
Garchar,
Kihor
And many more
all of which are of equal status. They belong to Kshatriya varna . Unlike other Ahir communities in Gujarat, the Maschoiya practice consanguineous marriages. Most of working on salt industry,transport,construction,farming,and extra fields.

See also 
 Ahir Boricha

References

;

Ahir